L.M.L. is the second English album and fifth overall studio album by Nu Virgos.

Content 
The title of the album comes from the song in the album titled "L.M.L.".

Release 
The album was released in Russia on September 13, 2007, and in Asia on September 19, 2007. The album hit the charts for a few months and the result was worth the efforts. In the first few months after release, the album was the money maker for the company Monolith. Author of the songs is, as always, Konstantin Meladze.

Track listing

Vocals
Nadezhda Meiher
Vera Brezhneva
Albina Dzhanabaeva
Olga Koryagina

Release history

External links
Official website

Nu Virgos albums
2007 albums